As one of the largest industrial nations and with the largest population in the European Union, Germany today offers a vast diversity of television stations.

Public channels

ARD
ARD, consortium of German public broadcasting services, consisting of the following public stations (which also provide regional programming in separate channels):
 Das Erste (The First) (ARD)
 ARD-alpha — German education channel, with TV courses
 One
 tagesschau24
 Bayerischer Rundfunk (BR)
 BR Fernsehen
 Hessischer Rundfunk (HR)
 hr-fernsehen
 Mitteldeutscher Rundfunk (MDR)
 MDR Fernsehen
 Norddeutscher Rundfunk (NDR)
 NDR Fernsehen
 Radio Bremen (RB)
 Radio Bremen TV
 Rundfunk Berlin-Brandenburg (RBB; established on 1 May 2003 from a merger of the former Sender Freies Berlin and Ostdeutscher Rundfunk Brandenburg)
 RBB Fernsehen
 Saarländischer Rundfunk (SR)
 SR Fernsehen
 Südwestrundfunk (SWR; established on 1 October 1998 from a merger of the former Südwestfunk and Süddeutscher Rundfunk)
 SWR Fernsehen
 Westdeutscher Rundfunk (WDR)
 WDR Fernsehen

ZDF
 ZDF (Zweites Deutsches Fernsehen, "Second German Television"):
 ZDFneo
 ZDFinfo

ARD & ZDF
 KiKA Der Kinderkanal — public, non-commercial children's TV, with support of ARD and ZDF
 Arte — public Franco-German culture channel from ARD, ZDF and France Télévisions
 3sat — cultural network from the ARD, ZDF, ORF (Austrian Broadcasting), and SRG (Swiss Broadcasting).
 Phoenix — public - with information, documentaries, news, jointly operated by ARD and ZDF

DFF (defunct)
 Deutscher Fernsehfunk or "Fernsehen der DDR" operated the two (now defunct) television networks of East Germany

Private channels (Free-TV)

RTL Deutschland 

 RTL Television
 VOX
 RTL Zwei
 RTL Up
 Nitro
 Super RTL
 n-tv
 Toggo Plus
 VOXup

ProSiebenSat.1 Media 

 Sat.1
 ProSieben
 kabel eins
 sixx
 Sat.1 Gold
 ProSieben Maxx
 kabel eins Doku

Paramount Global 

 Comedy Central
 Nickelodeon
 MTV Germany

Warner Bros. Discovery EMEA 

 DMAX
 Eurosport 1
 TLC
 HGTV
 Tele 5

WeltN24 

 Welt
 N24 Doku
 Bild TV

Others 

 Anixe (DE)
 center.tv
 Flux.tv
 Disney Channel
 SPORT1

Pay-TV 
Sky Deutschland

Sky 
 Sky Cinema Premieren
 Sky Cinema Premieren +24
 Sky Cinema Action
 Sky Cinema Best Of
 Sky Cinema Classics
 Sky Cinema Family
 Sky Cinema Fun
 Sky Cinema Special
 Sky Cinema Thriller
 Sky Comedy
 Sky Crime
 Sky Documentaries
 Sky Krimi
 Sky Nature
 Sky One
 Sky Replay
 Sky Showcase
 Sky Sport News
 Sky Sport 1 - 11
 Sky Bundesliga 1 - 11

RTL Deutschland 
 RTL Crime
 RTL Passion
 RTL Living
 GEO Television
 Toggo Plus

ProSiebenSat.1 Media 
 Sat.1 emotions
 ProSieben Fun
 kabel eins classics

Mainstream Media 
 Heimatkanal (DE)
 Romance TV (DE)
 Goldstar (DE)

Warner Bros. Discovery Germany 
 Animal Planet Germany
 Discovery Channel Germany
 Eurosport 2
 Boomerang
 Cartoon Network
 WarnerTV Comedy
 WarnerTV Film
 WarnerTV Serie

Paramount Global 
 MTV Germany
 MTV Music
 Nicktoons
 Nick Jr.

NBCUniversal 

 13th Street
 Syfy
 Universal TV

Sony Pictures Television 

 Sony AXN
 Sony Channel

A&E Networks 

 Crime + Investigation
 History

Others 
 Spiegel Geschichte (DE)
 Beate-Uhse.TV
 Kinowelt TV
 Motorvision (DE)
 Sportdigital
 Stingray Classica
 Blue Movie (DE)
 Junior
 National Geographic Channel
 Nat Geo Wild

Regional channels 
 Baden TV
 HD Campus TV
 filstalwelle
 KraichgauTV
 L-TV
 Regio TV Bodensee
 Regio TV Schwaben
 Regio TV Stuttgart
 Rhein-Neckar Fernsehen
 RTF.1
 augsburg.tv
 Niederbayern TV Deggendorf-Straubing
 Franken Fernsehen
 Herzo.TV
 intv
 Niederbayern TV Landshut
 ITV Coburg + ITV info
 Kulmbach TV
 münchen.tv
 münchen2
 Oberpfalz TV
 Regionalfernsehen Oberbayern
 Niederbayern TV Passau
 allgäu.tv
 TV Oberfranken
 TV Mainfranken (tvm)
 TVA - TVAktuell
 Alex Offener Kanal Berlin (Wedding)
 Spreekanal
 BFtv
 Elbe-Elster-Fernsehen
 jüterbog-tv:
 KW-TV
 Lausitz TV
 luck-tv:
 Neiße Welle Guben (NWG)
 Oderland.TV
 Oder-Spree Fernsehen (OSF)
 Fernsehen für Ostbrandenburg (ODF)
 OHV TV
 PotsdamTV
 Usedom TV
 rangsdorf-tv:
 sabinchen-tv:
 SKB Stadtfernsehen Brandenburg
 Strausberg TV
 teltOwkanal
 tv-lu
 WMZ TV
 Radio Weser.TV
 Hamburg 1
 Tide (Bürger- und Ausbildungskanal)Tide TV
 noa4
 Offener Kanal Fulda
 Offener Kanal Gießen
 Offener Kanal Kassel
 Offener Kanal Offenbach/Frankfurt
 OF-TV
 rheinmaintv
 Rok-tv - FiSCH - TV Fernsehen in Schwerin
 Greifswald-TV
 Grevesmühlen-TV
 MV1
 neu'eins
 rok-tv
 Rügen TV & Stralsund TV
 tv.rostock
 TV-Schwerin
 Vorpommern TV
 Wismar TV
 Ems TV
 Friesischer Rundfunk
 H1 (Fernsehen)
 oldenburg eins
 os1.tv
 Radio Weser.TV
 regiotv
 TV38
 CityVision
 nrwision
 Studio 47
 :OKTV Südwestpfalz
 naheTV
 Offener Kanal Kirchheimbolanden
 RheinLokal
 OK Weinstraße
 OK-KL
 OK:TV Mainz
 OK54 Bürgerrundfunk
 OK-TV Ludwigshafen
 OK4
 rheinahr.tv
 Rhein-Neckar Fernsehen
 TV Mittelrhein
 wwtv
 Coswiger Infokanal K3
 Dresden Fernsehen
 Dresdeneins
 eff 3
 Elsterwelle
 eRtv - euro-Regional tv
 Infokanal Crimmitschau
 Kabeljournal Flöha
 KabelJournal Chemnitzer-Land
 kanal 8 dresden
 kanal 8 sport
 Kanal 9 Erzgebirge
 Kanal Eins
 Leipzig Fernsehen
 Mittel Erzgebirgs Fernsehen
 Mittelsachsen TV
 mwdigital
 Nordsachsen TV
 Pirna TV/Prohlis TV
 punkteins oberlausitz TV
 Regio TV Borna
 Riesa TV
 Sachsen Fernsehen
 TV Westsachsen (TV W)
 Torgau TV
 TV Zwönitztal/tele-Journal
 TV-Laußig
 tvM Meissen Fernsehen
 Vogtland Regional Fernsehen (VRF)
 kulturmdTV
 MDF.1
 Offener Kanal Magdeburg
 Offener Kanal Merseburg-Querfurt
 Offener Kanal Wettin
 punktum
 RAN1
 Regionalfernsehen Bitterfeld-Wolfen (RBW Regionalfernsehen)
 Regionalfernsehen HarzRFH
 TV Halle
 Kiel TV
 Offener Kanal Flensburg
 Bad Berka TV
 JenaTV
 Kabel Plus
 Rennsteig.TV
 Saale-Info-Kanal
 salve.tv
 Stadtkanal Steinach
 Südthüringer Regionalfernsehen (SRF)
 Telemedien Rudolstadt
 tv.altenburg

Defunct television channels 
 9Live
 Das Vierte
 Disney Junior
 Disney XD
 Düzgün TV
 EinsPlus
 Fox Channel
 GIGA Television
 K1010
 MTV2 Pop
 MTV Brand New
 Musicbox
 Onyx.tv
 Terranova
 TIMM
 TM3
 Toon Disney
 VH-1 Deutschland
 VIVA
 VIVA Plus
 VIVA Zwei
 XXP
 ZDFdokukanal
 ZDFkultur
 ZDF Musikkanal
 ZDFtheaterkanal

See also 
 Television in Germany
 Media of Germany

 
Germany
Television in Germany
Stations